Henry Bland (circa 1677 – 24 May 1746) was an English cleric.

He was born around 1667 in Yorkshire and educated at Eton College and King's College, Cambridge. He was Rector of Great Bircham, Norfolk from 1706 to 1744 and of Harpley, Norfolk, 1715 to 1744; an Honorary Chaplain to the King and Chaplain to the Royal Chelsea Hospital from 1716; Headmaster of Doncaster School from 1699 to 1710 and then of Eton College from 1719; and Canon of Windsor from 1723 to 1733.

In later life he was Dean of Durham from 1728 to 1746 and Provost of Eton College from 1732 to 1746.

He died on 24 May 1746.

References

Clergy from Yorkshire
1746 deaths
Head Masters of Eton College
People educated at Eton College
Alumni of King's College, Cambridge
Provosts of Eton College
Canons of Windsor
1670s births